Sveti Andrija (meaning "Saint Andrew"), often called Svetac (meaning "saint"), is an island in the Croatian part of the Adriatic Sea. It is uninhabited, although it used to have permanent residents.

Svetac was inhabited in prehistoric era, as evidenced by archeological remains, the oldest of which were found in Tovorski bod, a cave in the south part of the island. A Benedictine monastery built on the island was abandoned in late 15th or early 16th century. In 1760, a small pine tar factory was opened. After the pine forest on the island was completely cut down, the factory was closed, and Svetac was acquired by members of Zanki family, who settled there. The population census on Svetac from 1951 was around 60, all members of Zanki family. The last one of the group who lived there all year round was Antonija Zanki, an elderly woman who died in 2001. Now members of Zanki family effectively live there four to six months a year, from late spring to autumn, still keeping up the houses of their grandfathers, fishing, making red wine and olive oil. Most of members of Zanki family who own this, biggest private island in Adriatic, live in Komiža now (14 nm east). Taking the fact that island is in open seas, without any natural protected bay, gives even greater respect to members of this family who managed to survive there for centuries, and furthermore created a special kind of living, especially today.

Approximately 300 meters off the south-west coast of the island there is the islet of Kamik, and farther on the open sea there is the volcanic island called Jabuka. About  to the southeast there is the small volcanic island of Brusnik.

Svetac is a breeding ground for a small number of Eleonora's falcons, a rare bird with only c. 40–80 nesting pairs estimated to live on the outer Croatian Adriatic islands. The falcons migrate to Madagascar every September and return to their nests in April.

See also
 Jabuka–Andrija Fault

References

Bibliography

Mithad Kozličić, Josip Faričić: "The Significance of Sv. Andrija Island (Svetac) on a Sailing Route Across the Adriatic Presented on Old Geographical Maps"

Uninhabited islands of Croatia
Islands of the Adriatic Sea
Landforms of Split-Dalmatia County
Private islands of Croatia